Yefri Alexis Reyes González (born 23 August 1995) is a Dominican footballer who plays for Atlético Vega Real and the Dominican Republic national team as a centre back. He also holds Spanish citizenship.

Club career
Born in San Cristóbal, Reyes moved to Llanes in 2002, aged seven, and developed in CD Llanes almost his entire youth career, except for the final year, which he played at CD Roces. He made his senior debuts for Llanes on 11 November 2012, in  Tercera División.

International career
Reyes made his international debut for Dominican Republic on 26 March 2016, starting in a 1–2 loss against Curaçao for the 2017 Caribbean Cup qualification.

References

External links

Yefri Reyes at LaPreferente.com

Yefri Reyes at Resultados-Futbol.com

1995 births
Living people
People from San Cristóbal, Dominican Republic
Dominican Republic footballers
Association football central defenders
Tercera División players
Divisiones Regionales de Fútbol players
Dominican Republic international footballers
Dominican Republic emigrants to Spain
Naturalised citizens of Spain
Spanish footballers
Deportivo Rayo Cantabria players
Liga Dominicana de Fútbol players